Robert Dietrich (25 July 1986 – 7 September 2011) was a professional ice hockey defenceman. He was killed in the 2011 Lokomotiv Yaroslavl plane crash, in which all players and coaches on board the plane from the club perished.

Playing career
Dietrich was drafted 174th overall in the sixth round of the 2007 NHL Entry Draft by the Nashville Predators. He played with the DEG Metro Stars of the DEL from 2005 to the 2008. On 16 July 2007, Dietrich was signed to a three-year entry level contract with the Predators. He was reassigned on loan to the Metro Stars for his first year of the contract, before he spent the final two seasons in North America with the Predators American Hockey League affiliate, the Milwaukee Admirals.

In his second year with the Admirals in 2009–10, Dietrich led the team with 43 points for defenseman, but was unable to appear in the NHL with Nashville. On 8 June 2010, Dietrich returned to Germany and signed a two-year contract with Adler Mannheim.

Death

On 7 September 2011, Dietrich was killed when a Yakovlev Yak-42 passenger aircraft, carrying nearly the entire Lokomotiv team, crashed just outside Yaroslavl, Russia. The team was traveling to Minsk, Belarus to play their opening game of the season, with its coaching staff and prospects. Lokomotiv officials said "everyone from the main roster was on the plane plus four players from the youth team."

Career statistics

Regular season and playoffs

International

See also
List of ice hockey players who died during their playing career

References

External links

1986 births
2011 deaths
Adler Mannheim players
Citizens of Germany through descent
DEG Metro Stars players
EC Peiting players
German ice hockey defencemen
Soviet emigrants to Germany
German people of Kazakhstani descent
Kazakhstani people of German descent
Milwaukee Admirals players
Nashville Predators draft picks
Russian and Soviet-German people
Straubing Tigers players
Victims of the Lokomotiv Yaroslavl plane crash
People from Kaufbeuren
Sportspeople from Swabia (Bavaria)
German expatriate ice hockey people
German expatriate sportspeople in the United States
German expatriate sportspeople in Russia
Expatriate ice hockey players in Russia
Expatriate ice hockey players in the United States